Recollection is the retrieval of memory, the act of remembering.

Recollection may also refer to :

Music
"Recollection" (Hob. XXVIa:26), English song by Franz Joseph Haydn

Albums
Recollection (Superchick album)
Recollection (k.d. Lang album)
Recollection (Leslie Phillips album)
Recollection (Strawbs album)
Recollection, album by Laurent Voulzy 2008, #2 in France
Recollection, an album by Creedence Clearwater Revisited
Recollection: The Best of Concrete Blonde
Recollection: The Best of Nichole Nordeman

Other
The Recollection, a 2011 science fiction novel by Gareth L. Powell
 a congregation of Recollects, a type of reformation within a religious (notably Catholic) order